Joachim Boldsen (born 30 April 1978) is a Danish former team handball player. He is European Champion by winning the 2008 European Men's Handball Championship with the Danish national handball team.

Boldsen recently played for KIF Kolding København, and has previously played for Danish Handball League side AaB Håndbold and Spanish league side FC Barcelona.

Career

Club career

In Boldsen's earliest career, he played for such clubs as Helsingør IF (from 1993), GOG Gudme (two seasons, 1997–1999), TV Großwallstadt (two seasons, 1999–2001), and Ajax Farum. From 2001 to 2007, he played with the German first league team SG Flensburg-Handewitt, helping them to win their first championship in 2004. He won the DHB-Pokal with Flensburg in 2003, 2004 and 2005. In 2007, he changed to Danish Handball League team AaB Håndbold for a single season before switching to FC Barcelona Handbol. With FC Barcelona, he won the Spanish Supercup in 2008/2009. In 2010 he changed for Danish team AG Håndbold. Here he won the danish championship two times and made it to final4 in champions league.

National handball team career
Boldsen had his debut on the Danish national handball team on August 23, 1998, and in the following ten years he played 186 matches for the team, scoring 405 goals. On September 30, 2008, he announced that he was resigning from the national team due to the increased traveling hours following his change to FC Barcelona. In his career, he was part of winning the 2008 European Championship, and part of the bronze winning team in the 2007 World Championship as well as bronze in the European Championships in 2002, 2004, and 2006. Boldsen played at the 2008 Summer Olympics in Beijing, where Denmark reached the quarter finals, and placed seventh after being eliminated by Croatia.

As a junior, Boldsen became Junior European Champion with Denmark in 1996, and Junior World Champion in 1997.

Personal life
Boldsen is the son of former national-team handball player, Steen Boldsen. He is married to Nancy Rietveld Boldsen, with whom he has the daughter Fleur. He has participated in TV 2's Vild med dans, the Danish version of Dancing with the Stars, but had to withdraw due to an injury he got at handball practice.

References

External links

 FCBarcelona.com profile

1978 births
Living people
Danish male handball players
Danish expatriate sportspeople in Spain
FC Barcelona Handbol players
SG Flensburg-Handewitt players
Olympic handball players of Denmark
Handball players at the 2008 Summer Olympics
Liga ASOBAL players
Aalborg Håndbold players
People from Helsingør
Sportspeople from the Capital Region of Denmark